Janice Burgess (born 1954) is a former television executive, screenwriter, and producer for Nickelodeon. She created the Nick Jr. series The Backyardigans and worked as a writer and creative director for Nickelodeon's revival of Winx Club. Both shows were produced at the Nickelodeon Animation Studio. Burgess joined Nickelodeon in 1995 as executive-in-charge of production.

Biography

Early life and education
Burgess grew up in the Squirrel Hill neighborhood of Pittsburgh, Pennsylvania, and attended The Ellis School. Planning to become an art historian, she graduated from Brandeis University in 1974 with a bachelor's degree in art history.

Career
According to an interview with Investor's Business Daily, Burgess did not enjoy traveling "in art circles with collectors and high society," so she sought out a different career after college. She volunteered for a job at the public television station WQED, where she was put in charge of craft services.

In the early 1990s, Janice Burgess held positions at the Children's Television Workshop, including as an assistant travel coordinator for 3-2-1 Contact and project manager for Ghostwriter. For the latter, she coordinated the efforts of a tie-in magazine and teacher materials with the content and goals of the television show. It was during this job that she was notified of an opening at Nickelodeon; Burgess joked that she interviewed for the job "about 11,000 times." She was hired as the executive in charge of production for Nick Jr., overseeing the development of Blue's Clues and Little Bill. Burgess later became the vice president of Nickelodeon's Nick Jr. division.

While working as an executive, Burgess attended scripting and concept development meetings, where she enjoyed helping the creative teams with characters and storylines. Burgess was eventually given the opportunity to transition to a creative role by her manager, Brown Johnson. She asked Burgess to develop an idea for a new Nick Jr. show, and Burgess produced a pilot episode called "Me and My Friends" at Nickelodeon Studios Florida in 1998. The pilot was a live-action, full-body puppet show that featured music and dance. It was not picked up for a full series, but several months after the rejection, Brown Johnson asked Burgess to retool the concept. She liked the characters and music from Burgess's pilot and felt the show would work better in animation.

Using the characters from "Me and My Friends," Burgess wrote a second pilot, which was produced at Nickelodeon's New York studio in 2001. The show, now fully computer-animated and renamed The Backyardigans, was greenlit for a full season of 20 episodes. Reflecting on the shift to animation, Burgess said, "Sometimes your first attempt is just not all that great. In this case, my second attempt was much better." The Backyardigans premiered on Nickelodeon on October 11, 2004.

Janice Burgess served as executive producer for The Backyardigans throughout its run of four seasons. In 2006, she described her work on the show positively: "making The Backyardigans has become sort of like an adventure that I go on with my friends. Of course, we get paid, but we do get to be carefree in our work, enjoy each other, hang around a lot, travel a little bit, and make up stuff."

Burgess drew inspiration from action films when writing episodes of the show, as she wanted to adapt high-stakes stories for a young audience. The series received eight Daytime Emmy Award nominations, and Burgess won the 2008 Emmy for Outstanding Special Class Animated Program. After The Backyardigans wrapped production in 2010 on the fourth and final season, much of the series' staff members regrouped to work on Nickelodeon's Winx Club, including Burgess. She worked as a writer, story editor, and creative director on the action-adventure series.

References

Living people
1954 births
American entertainment industry businesspeople
Television producers from Pennsylvania
American women television writers
African-American television producers
Businesspeople from Pittsburgh
The Ellis School alumni
Brandeis University alumni
Nickelodeon Animation Studio people